Kayama (written: ,) is a Japanese surname. Notable people with the surname include:

, Japanese swimmer
, Japanese professional baseball player
, Japanese mayor
, Japanese businessman
, Japanese musician and actor

Fictional characters
, a character in the anime series Super Doll Licca-chan

See also
Kayama Station, a railway station in Odawara, Kanagawa Prefecture, Japan

Japanese-language surnames